Leithen Valley, also called Valley of the Seven Mills, is a valley of about two kilometres length at the border of Peuerbach and Neukirchen am Walde in Upper-Austria that is very popular among hikers due to its beautiful landscape and the proximity to Koaserin Nature Reserve. Up to the second halfe of the 20th century it was characterised by its remarkable concentration of watermills, sawmills and other craft enterprises.

The valley extends from Stroiss Mill in the west to Furthner Mill in the east. Latter was first officially mentioned in 1371. The tradition of electricity generation, that exists in Leithen Valley since 1902 is continued after the termination of the mills as well as the production of agricultural machines by the Puehringer Company, that has its roots in a smithy first mentioned in 1649, and counts to the oldest enterprises in Grieskirchen District.

Mills in the valley 
 Stroiss Mill (former Steinwehr Mill)
 Mitter Mill
 Ehlinger Mill
 Kupferhamer Mill
 Reischl Mill
 Achleithner Mill
 Furthner Mill

References 

Landforms of Austria
Valleys of Europe